Januszewice may refer to the following places:
Januszewice, Greater Poland Voivodeship (west-central Poland)
Januszewice, Łódź Voivodeship (central Poland)
Januszewice, Świętokrzyskie Voivodeship (south-central Poland)